Mike White is a New Zealand investigative journalist, photographer and author, and former foreign correspondent (Afghanistan, Pakistan and Iraq). He has written two books and has won many awards for his magazine articles on themes of justice within New Zealand. He is also an awarded travel writer. White has won New Zealand Feature Writer of the Year (Qantas / Canon / Voyager Media Awards) three times, and a Wolfson Fellowship to the University of Cambridge. He has also won the Cathay Pacific New Zealand Travel Writer of the Year title three times.

Early life and education
White grew up near Blenheim, and graduated with a political science and history degree from the University of Canterbury in the mid-80s. In 1996, he graduated from the Wellington Polytechnic (now Massey University) School of Journalism.

Career
After six years working as reporter and chief reporter for the Marlborough Express in Blenheim, he left to work as a foreign correspondent in Afghanistan, Pakistan and Iraq.

In 2003 White returned to New Zealand to write full-time for North & South, a current affairs monthly magazine, becoming a senior staff writer. He is now a senior writer for Stuff,  and is based in Wellington. 

In an eight-page North & South article in 2015 (Long Walk to Justice)  White asked if New Zealand's justice system should establish an independent commission to investigate wrongful convictions. White researched this story in the UK during his Wolfson Press Fellowship to the University of Cambridge. 

White covered the Ben Smart and Olivia Hope/Scott Watson case as a reporter on the Marlborough Express from 1998; he revisited the case for North & South in December 2007. In 2014 Scott Watson invited White to interview him in prison, having maintained his innocence for 18 years. The Department of Corrections sought to prevent that meeting. It took more than a year and a hearing in the High Court to overturn that decision. White described the widely reported verdict as a "win for journalism."

"The judge has realised that journalists have a special role in investigating cases of potential miscarriage of justice and has enforced that role. In certain circumstances, journalists do have a responsibility to investigate these cases and the best way to do that is by talking to the people who have been convicted and imprisoned."

White's story on the interview with Watson in Rolleston Prison was published in North & South in December 2015. In November 2016, after again taking the Corrections Department to the High Court, he covered the first meeting between Scott Watson and Olivia's father, Gerald Hope, also held in Rolleston Prison.

White has also written extensively on the Lundy case. In 2015 he spent two months in Courtroom One at Wellington’s High Court, covering the retrial of Mark Lundy for North & South. It’s a case he had been following for seven years. His 18-page story: The Lundy Murders: What the Jury Didn’t Hear, in North & South’s February 2009 issue, led to international lawyers and experts joining Lundy’s team and eventually having his conviction quashed by the Privy Council in 2013. White’s story on Lundy’s trial and reconviction in May 2015  examined whether the justice system was able to cope with such a complex case – and if the jury got it right.

In 2016 White and his long time partner, Wellington journalist Nikki Macdonald, took over the editing of long-form journalism website Featured from the journalist and author Naomi Arnold.

Awards 

 1997 Qantas Media Awards Student Journalist of the Year.
2004 Qantas Media Awards: Environment & Conservation (best feature) 
 2004 Citigroup Journalism Awards for Excellence: General Business Category Winner  
 2005 Qantas Media Awards Government, Diplomacy and Foreign Affairs Winner 
 2005 Qantas Media Awards Science and Technology Winner 
2006 Cathay Pacific Travel Media Awards Best Magazine Travel Story
 2006 Cathay Pacific Travel Media Awards Travel Writer of The Year.
 2007 Qantas Media Awards Magazine Feature Writer of the Year 
 2007 Qantas Media Awards Crime & Justice 
 2007 Qantas Media Awards Science & Technology 
 2008 MPA Awards Journalist of the Year Supreme Winner & Current Affairs Winner
 2008 Qantas Media Awards  Best Columnist Sport & Racing 
 2008 Qantas Media Awards Crime & Justice 
 2009 Qantas Media Awards Technology & Science, Device Technologies Award 
 2010 Cathay Pacific Travel Awards Heritage Hotels Award for the Best Travel Article Written About New Zealand 
 2010 Qantas Media Awards Best Profile 
 2011 Canon Media Awards Feature Writer Science/environment 
 2012 Cathay Pacific Travel Awards: Heritage Hotels Award for the Best Travel Story about New Zealand 
2013 Canon Media Awards Magazine Feature Writer of the Year
2013 Canon Media Awards Magazine Feature Writer Politics 
2013 Canon Media Awards Magazine Feature Writer Arts and Entertainment
2013 Cathay Pacific Travel Awards Heritage Hotels Award for the Best Travel Story about New Zealand 
 2013 Cathay Pacific Travel Awards NZ Maori Tourism Award for the Best Travel Story about a Maori Tourism Experience 
 2014 Canon Media Awards Magazine Feature Writer, Science and Environment 
 2013 Wolfson Fellowship to the University of Cambridge 
 2014 Cathay Pacific Travel Awards Heritage Hotels Award for the Best Travel Story about New Zealand Winner 
 2015 Cathay Pacific Travel Media Awards NZ Maori Tourism Award for the Best Travel Story about a Maori Tourism Experience 
2015 Canon Media Awards Magazine Feature Writer Arts and Entertainment 
2016 Canon Media Awards Feature Writer of the Year 
2016 Canon Media Awards Feature Writer Crime & Justice 
2018 Voyager Media Awards Feature Writer Crime, Justice and Social Issues

Books 

 2015 Who Killed Scott Guy? Allen & Unwin.  
 2019 How to Walk a Dog, Allen & Unwin.

References 

New Zealand investigative journalists
Year of birth missing (living people)
Living people
New Zealand journalists
New Zealand writers